Americanish is a 2021 American comedy film written by Aizzah Fatima and Iman Zawahry, directed by Zawahry and starring Fatima, Salena Qureshi, Shenaz Treasury, Lillete Dubey, Mohammed Amer, Ajay Naidu, Godfrey, Kapil Talwalkar, George Wendt and David Rasche.

Cast
Lillete Dubey as Khala
Aizzah Fatima as Sam Khan
Salena Qureshi as Maryam Khan
Shenaz Treasury as Ameera
George Wendt as Douglas Smarts
Ajay Naidu as Jawad
David Rasche as Jim
Mohammed Amer as Zane
Godfrey as Gabriel Jackson
Kapil Talwalkar as Shahid

Release
The film premiered at CAAMFest on May 23, 2021.

Reception
The film has a 71% rating on Rotten Tomatoes based on seven reviews.

Joey Morona of The Plain Dealer gave the film a positive review and wrote, "A celebration of love, life and culture, the film exudes joy and hope. What’s more American than that?"

Sabina Dana Plasse of Film Threat rated the film an 8 out of 10 and wrote that it "examines the good and bad aspects of tradition while exposing the need for acceptance in society."

References

External links